The Irish Mercantile Marine during World War II continued essential overseas trade in the conflict, a period referred to as The Long Watch by Irish mariners.

Irish merchant shipping saw to it that vital imports continued to arrive and exports, mainly food supplies to Great Britain, were delivered. Irish ships sailed unarmed and usually alone, identifying themselves as neutrals with bright lights and by painting the Irish tricolour and EIRE in large letters on their sides and decks. Nonetheless twenty percent of seamen serving in Irish ships perished, victims of a war not their own: attacked by both sides, though predominantly by the Axis powers. Often, Allied convoys did not stop to pick up survivors, while Irish ships regularly answered SOS signals and stopped to rescue survivors, irrespective of which side they belonged to. Irish ships rescued 534 seamen.

At the outbreak of World War II, known as "The Emergency", Ireland declared neutrality and became isolated as never before. Shipping had been neglected since the Irish War of Independence. Foreign ships, on which Ireland's trade had hitherto depended, were less available; neutral American ships would not enter the "war zone". In his Saint Patrick's Day address in 1940, Taoiseach Éamon de Valera lamented:

"No country had ever been more effectively blockaded because of the activities of belligerents and our lack of ships..."

Ireland was a net food exporter. The excess was shipped to Britain. The Irish Mercantile Marine ensured that Irish agricultural, and other, exports reached Britain, and that British coal arrived in Ireland. Some foods such as wheat, citric fruits and tea were imported. Ireland depended on, mainly, British tankers for petroleum. Initially Irish ships sailed in British convoys. In the light of experience they chose to sail alone, relying on their neutral markings. German respect for that neutrality varied from friendly to tragic.

"Cross-channel" trade, between Ireland and Britain, was from both national perspectives, the most important Irish trade route. Irish ships crossed the Atlantic on a route defined by the Allies: a line from Fastnet Rock to the Azores and then along the line of latitude at 38° North. Ships on the "Lisbon-run", imported wheat and fruits from Spain and Portugal, as well as goods transhipped from the Americas. They followed the line of longitude at 12° West, while Allied convoys to Gibraltar were 20° West.

There were never more than 800 men, at any one time, serving on Irish ships in the war.

Background

Following independence in 1921, there was no state encouragement to develop the mercantile marine. "Our new leaders seemed to turn their backs upon the sea and to ignore the fact that we are an island". Each year the fleet declined. In 1923, the merchant fleet consisted of 127 ships. This number dropped every year until 1939 when, at the start of World War II, the fleet numbered only 56 ships. Only 5% of imports were carried on Irish flagged vessels. There were several reasons for this decline: a consequence of the war of independence, a policy of self-sufficiency, the economic depression, the lack of investment and government neglect. Foreign ships, on which Ireland had hitherto depended, were withdrawn. "In the period April 1941 and June 1942 only seven such ships visited the country".
The war of independence (1919–1921), and the civil war (1921–1922) which followed it, left the country in near economic collapse. There had been destruction of industry and infrastructure. Many industries relocated abroad. It was often cheaper to transport by sea, within Ireland, rather than using the poor road and rail networks. To take advantage of this commercial opportunity, new coasters were acquired in the 1930s, intended to ply between Irish ports. These ships would be invaluable once hostilities began. Many of these small coasters were lost, particularly on the "Lisbon run", a voyage for which they were never intended.

The then Taoiseach (Prime Minister) Éamon de Valera advocated a policy of self-sufficiency. Foreign imports were discouraged. "It was an important status symbol in the modern world for a country to produce her own goods and be self-sufficient."

The global economic depression of the early 1930s affected Ireland less because of the partial recovery following the civil war and because industry was protected behind tariff barriers established in the Anglo-Irish Trade War (1932–1938). The need for extra sea capacity was readily met by British and other foreign ships. Foreign ships were used, rather than preserving the home fleet. Banks were reluctant to lend to Irish industry, preferring British government gilts.

Although there was state support for many industries, this did not extend to shipping. In 1933 de Valera's government established the Turf Development Board, turf became Ireland's primary source of fuel during the emergency years and was stockpiled as imported coal was in short supply. In 1935 civil servants in de Valera's own department warned him of the consequences a war would have on the importation of fuel. He ignored that warning. Earlier, in 1926 the Ports and Harbours Tribunal was initiated. The tribunal received "abundant evidence" of "inefficient, uneconomic and extravagant management". It submitted a report in 1930 with recommendations which were not implemented until after the war. The tribunal observed "the public generally do not, we fear, appreciate the importance of our harbours ...". Vickers-Armstrongs liquidated their subsidiary Vickers (Ireland) Ltd. on 15 November 1938; their Dublin Dockyard had ceased operation in 1937.

On 2 September 1939 the "realisation dawned on Ireland that the country was surrounded by water and that the sea was of vital importance to her". By this point, however, British wartime restrictions on shipping were already in place. Historian Bryce Evans has argued that the failure of Seán Lemass and others to establish an Irish mercantile marine in the 1930s would exacerbate Irish supply problems in the Second World War.

Response

Seán Lemass as Minister for Industry and Commerce, and later Minister for Supplies sought to address these issues. Many infant industries were developed in the 1930s behind a protective tariff barrier. (This is the origin of the term "Tariff Jews", Seán Lemass from 1932 helped Jewish entrepreneurs to set up manufacturing businesses) These industries proved valuable in the war years. They reduced the need for imports, for example in 1931 over five million pairs of shoes were imported, by 1938 this had fallen to a quarter of a million pairs. Between 1931 and 1938, Gross Industrial Output rose from £55 million to £90 million; and Industrial Employment from 162,000 to 217,000. In 1933 the government established the Industrial Credit Corporation to finance industry. In 1938, Life Assurers were required to hold their reserves in Ireland, to make capital available for industry; promptly five of the six UK providers closed, lodging their business with Irish Assurance. Private enterprises established included: Grain Importers Ltd., Animal Feed Stuffs Ltd., Fuel Importers Ltd., Oil and Fats Ltd., Timber Importers Ltd., and Tea Importers Ltd. Industry was encouraged, such as the plans for Irish National Refineries Ltd. to build an oil refinery. The former Vickers repair yard in Dublin port was reopened, in 1940, by the Dublin Port and Docks Board. It repaired British and Irish ships. Semi-state enterprises were established, including Irish Shipping in 1941 which purchased nine vessels and leased six more.

War declared

At the outbreak of the Second World War Ireland declared neutrality. There were a total of 56 Irish ships at the outbreak of World War II; 15 more were purchased or leased in the conflict, and 16 were lost. Up to then most Irish-registered ships had been flying the red ensign of the United Kingdom Merchant Navy. All were required by UK law to fly the Red Ensign, but some, such as the Wexford Steamship Company ships, had always travelled under the tricolour. With the outbreak of hostilities, choices were forced. The Irish government ordered all Irish ships to fly the tricolour. Some British ships were on the Irish register, such as the whalers which were Scottish-owned (Christian Salvesen Shipping) but Irish-registered in order to take advantage of the Irish whale quota. The six whale catchers and the two factory ships were pressed into British naval service, after their owners transferred them to the British registry. Some ships which could be described as British also choose the Tricolour. Kerrymore, which was registered as belonging to R McGowan of Tralee, was actually owned by Kelly Colliers of Belfast. Most of the crew had addresses in loyalist areas of Belfast. For six years they sailed under the tricolour.

The British and Irish Steam Packet Company's  which operated the Dublin to Liverpool route, flew the tricolour. But, no flag was a protection against mines; Munster struck a mine approaching Liverpool and sank. There were over 200 passengers and 50 crew on board. A few hours later they were all rescued by the collier Ringwall. Four were injured; and one died later. The L&NWR ferries Cambria, Hibernia and Scotia were Irish-registered and sailed between Dún Laoghaire and Holyhead, under the Red Ensign. Their British crews were taken aback when the tricolour was hoisted. They went on strike and refused to sail until the ships were transferred to the British registry and red ensign was restored. Scotia was sunk in the Dunkirk evacuation with the loss of 30 crew and 300 troops. Hibernia had a fortunate escape on the night of 20 December 1940. She was berthing at Dún Laoghaire when a German bomber swooped down. All lights were extinguished. Bombs fell on the nearby Sandycove railway station. The GWR ferries operated the Rosslare to Fishguard route sailed under the red ensign. Thirty lives were lost when their Saint Patrick was bombed and sunk. The British and Irish Steam Packet Company had some of its ships on the British registry with others on the Irish registry.

Cargo

Exports

The main export was agricultural produce to Britain.

In the First World War, Ireland's food production increased to meet Britain's needs; a pattern which would be repeated for the Second World War.

The trade war between Ireland and Britain started in 1932, in which Britain imposed a tax on Irish products. Cattle from the Irish Republic were taxed but cattle from Northern Ireland were not. So, cattle were smuggled across the border. In 1934/5, about 100,000 cattle were "exported" in this way. The Department of Supplies was "all in favour of the smuggling and urged that nothing should be done which might stop it". By then, Britain was anxious to secure Irish food supplies before another world war. Survival in the looming war was the spur. 

There were a series of agreements from the "cattle-coal pact" of 1935 to the Anglo-Irish Trade Agreement of 1938 which ended the dispute, on terms favourable to Ireland.

 
Under the "cattle-coal pact", the British set up a central authority for the purchase of cattle, under John Maynard Keynes. The prices set before the war were attractive. As the war progressed, open market prices rose dramatically. Cattle from Northern Ireland fetched a better price, so smuggling, as practised in the trade war, resumed. 
Studies are inconclusive on how vital Irish food exports were to Britain, due to the difficulties in accounting for the effect of smuggling, the unreliability of statistics, and wartime censorship. While Ireland's food production was increasing, British food imports were falling; for example the UK imported 1,360,000 tons of food in August 1941, but only 674,000 tons in August 1942.

Before and during the second world war, Ireland was a net food exporter and the Irish people enjoyed a high calorie diet. (Nonetheless the poor experienced real deprivation). Food was donated to war-refugees in Spain. The nation did need to import certain foods, such as fruits, tea and wheat. Nearly half of Ireland's wheat was imported from Canada. Domestic food production relied on imported fertilizer  and imported animal feeding stuffs. In 1940, 74,000 tons of fertilizer were imported, only 7,000 tons arrived in 1941. Similarly 5 million tons of animal feed were imported in 1940, falling to one million in 1941 and negligible quantities thereafter.

Imports

 
Although Ireland had a surplus of food, some foods were not grown in Ireland, as the climate was unsuitable. Only small plots of wheat were cultivated. A series of orders for compulsory tillage were enacted, with the threat that those who did not put their fields to wheat would have their land confiscated. Yet, a shortfall remained and imports were required.Clashes between smugglers and Customs were commonplace. In 1940 the infamous "Battle of Dowra" took place on the border of Leitrim and Fermanagh. Revenue crews from Blacklion and Glenfarne intercepted over one hundred men with donkey loads of smuggled flour. Unwilling to part with their bounty, the smugglers used cudgels, boots, stones and fists in the ensuing struggle. Most of the flour was destroyed in the fray and some Revenue people were injured.

Early in 1942, the Allies restricted wheat deliveries to Ireland. In return, the Irish threatened to withhold the export of Guinness beer. To the great annoyance of David Gray, the United States Ambassador to Ireland, Ireland received 30,000 tons of wheat. Gray complained of a waste of "a vital necessity for what Americans regard at the best as a luxury and at worst a poison".

 By 1944–45 coal imports were only one-third of those of 1938-9 and supplies of oil had almost ceased. The production of town gas, manufactured from imported coal, was so adversely affected that regulations were brought in limiting its use, enforced by the "Glimmer Man". Britain relaxed these restrictions from 19 July 1944.

There were plans to build an oil refinery in Dublin. In the event, this refinery was not completed.
Britain asked Ireland to requisition the tankers, The reply was that it was not Irish policy to requisition vessels, instead offering to transfer them to the British register. They were transferred on the 6th, war had been declared on the 3rd.Two days after the transfer, on 11 September 1939, while still flying the Irish tricolour, Inverliffey was sunk. In spite of Captain William Trowsdale's protestation that they were Irish,  said that they "were sorry" but they would sink Inverliffey as she was carrying petrol to England, considered contraband to the Germans. U-38s next encounter with the Irish tricolour was less gallant. U-38 shelled the fishing trawler , all 11 crew were lost. Inver Tankers' entire fleet was lost in the war.

U-boat encounters

Vizeadmiral Karl Dönitz issued a standing order to U-boats on 4 September 1940, which defined belligerent, neutral and friendly powers. Neutral included "Ireland in particular". The order concluded: "Ireland forbids the navigation of her territorial waters by warships under threat of internment. That prohibition is to be strictly observed out of consideration for the proper preservation of her neutrality. Signed, Dönitz". However those orders did not always protect Irish ships. When  sank Luimneach on the Lisbon run, her commander recorded in his war diary "flying a British or Irish flag". A supplement to Dönitz's order found after  was scuttled off Cork read: "for political reasons, Irish ships and also at times Irish convoys are not to be attacked within the blockade zone if they are seen to be such. However, there is no special obligation to determine neutrality in the blockade zone.".

There were many encounters with U-boats, some pleasant, others not so. As Capt Shanks hailed from Belfast and therefore legally a British subject, this was considered unwise. Chief Officer Harry Cullen and four crew rowed to the U-boat. He said that his (39-year-old) captain was too elderly for the boat. He added that it would be Saint Patrick's Day in the morning. They were treated to schnapps in the conning tower and given a bottle of cognac to bring back to Irish Willow.

On 20 March 1943 , commanded by Kapitänleutnant Heinrich Oskar Bernbeck stopped Irish Elm. Rough seas prevented Elms crew from pulling their rowboat alongside the submarine to present their papers, so the interview was conducted by shouting. In the course of the conversation, Elms Chief Officer Patrick Hennessy gave Dún Laoghaire as his home address. Bernbeck asked if "the strike was still on in Downey's", a pub near Dún Laoghaire harbour. (The Downey's strike started in March 1939 and lasted 14 years.)

Convoys

The Irish and British authorities co-operated in the chartering of ships. They made combined purchases of wheat, maize, sugar, animal feeds and petrol. At the start of the war, Irish ships joined convoys protected by the Royal Navy. The advantages were protection and cheaper insurance. These advantages were not borne out by experience. So they chose to sail alone.

The ability to insure ships, cargo, and crew has a significant impact on the profitability of shipping. Insurance of Irish ships in the 'Long Watch' was problematic. One important aspect of this was that Irish ships usually didn't travel in convoy and insurers such as Lloyd's of London charged a higher premium to insure ships not in convoy. An example of the insurance problems faced, concerns the crew of City of Waterford. When this ship joined Convoy OG 74, the lives of the crew were insured. The ship suffered a collision with the Dutch tugboat Thames, and sank. Walmer Castle was bombed two days later and five of City of Waterfords survivors died. When their families made life insurance claims, they were refused, because at their time of death they were not crew of City of Waterford, but passengers of Walmer Castle. Later the Irish government introduced a compensation scheme for seamen lost or injured on Irish ships and Irish Shipping opened its own marine insurance subsidiary, which made a handsome profit.

As merchant ships of a neutral country the Limerick ships had no blackout facilities, and the Master of the British Convoy Commodore's ship, the liner , objected that this would make the convoy visible to the enemy at night. In an apparently vain attempt to make them less visible, the Vice Admiral who was Convoy Commodore positioned the two Irish ships in the centre of the convoy. Clonlara rescued 13 survivors from Alva. Two hours later  sank the Commodore ship Aguila and the British cargo ship Ciscar. Two days later  sank Clonlara. The   rescued 13 survivors (eight from Clonlara, five from Alva). Eight merchant ships, two naval escorts and over 400 lives were lost.

Five of the convoy's surviving merchant ships reached Gibraltar; 10 retreated to neutral Portugal. This was described as "a bitter act of surrender could ever come our way". In Lisbon Lanahrones crew went on strike, which was resolved with extra life-rafts and pay. The crew of Irish Poplar was waiting in Lisbon; when the remnants of OG 71 limped in. The crew of Irish Poplar resolved to sail home alone. While City of Dublin brought Clonlaras survivors to Cork, Lanahrone joined Convoy HG 73. Nine of the 25 ships in that convoy were lost. These experiences and the inability of the Royal Navy to protect merchant ships had a most profound effect on all Irish Ships. Thereafter they were blacked out when sailing in Allied convoys. Ship-owners, on the advice of their masters, decided not to sail their vessels in British convoys and by the early months of 1942 the practice had ceased.

Captain William Henderson of Irish Elm, returning from a transatlantic voyage reported "circled by two German bombers, probably Condors, they circled for a considerable time and inspected closely but didn't molest. The incident had given the crew great confidence in the protection afforded by the neutral markings".

Trade routes

British routes

This "cross-channel" trade accounted for most of Ireland's trade. The ships ranged, in age, from Dundalk, built two years before the start of the war in 1937, to Brooklands built in 1859. The most important vessels to Ireland were the ten colliers and to Britain the livestock carriers. Initially Germany respected the neutrality of Irish vessels, apologising for the first attack on the collier Kerry Head and paying compensation. Losses came from mines, rather than direct attacks. Meath suffered such a fate; while she was being inspected by the British Naval Control Service, she was struck by a magnetic mine, drowning seven hundred cattle, and destroying both vessels.

In August 1940 Germany "required" Ireland to cease food exports to Britain. On 17 August 1940, Germany declared a large area around Britain to be a "scene of warlike operations". It was believed that attacks on Irish ships and the bombing of Campile was to reinforce that message. Lord Haw-Haw in a broadcast on German, threatened that Dundalk would be bombed if the export of cattle to Britain continued. On 24 July 1941, George's Quay, Dundalk was bombed. Nonetheless, the trade continued.

The first attack, after the German ultimatum, was against the schooner Lock Ryan, returning to Arklow. She was strafed and bombed by three German aircraft. Fortunately Lock Ryans cargo of china clay absorbed the blast and although badly damaged, she survived. Germany acknowledged the attack but refused to pay compensation for the damage as she was in "the blockaded area", "through which the Irish had been offered free passage but on terms which were rejected". There were many attacks on ships on the cross-channel trade. In 1940 nine Irish ships were lost. That figure may be small compared with Allied losses, but it represents a larger proportion of the small Irish fleet.

There were restrictions on reporting attacks on ships. Frank Aiken, the Minister for the Co-ordination of Defensive Measures, whose responsibilities included censorship, reverted this policy. His intention was to let Germany know that the Irish public know, and "they don't like it". There had been a British proposal for transshipment.  William Warnock, the Irish chargé d'affaires in Berlin told Germany that Ireland was refusing to transship British cargoes, while protesting against the attacks on Irish ships, and other neutral ships with Irish cargoes. Deliberate attacks on cross-channel shipping ceased on 5 November 1941, when the collier Glencree was strafed. There were attacks on other routes. Mines were a constant danger.

The Iberian trade

In November 1939, Roosevelt signed the Fourth Neutrality Act forbidding American ships from entering the "war zone", which was defined as a line drawn from Spain to Iceland. Cargoes intended for Ireland were shipped to Portugal. It was up to the Irish to fetch them from there. This route, known as the Iberian Trade or the Lisbon run. Setting sail from Ireland, the ships would carry agricultural products to the United Kingdom. There they would discharge their cargo, load up on fuel, pick up a British export (often coal), and carry it to Portugal. In Portugal, usually Lisbon, Irish ships loaded the waiting American cargo, such as fertilizer or agricultural machinery.

Sometimes the cargo was not there: it may have been delayed, or lost at sea due to the war. In this case, the Irish captains would load a "cargo of opportunity" and bring it back to Ireland. This might be wheat or oranges; on occasions, they even purchased their own cargo of coal.  was fortunate to have a cargo of coal when two unidentified aircraft attacked her with cannon fire. The shells lodged in the coal, rather than piercing her hull. Britain denied involvement, but when the coal was discharged shell fragments of British manufacture were found. The attackers were de Havilland Mosquitos of the Polish squadron of the RAF.

The Cymric was not so fortunate, she vanished in the same waters without a trace.

The Lisbon run was undertaken by small coastal trading vessels, commonly called coasters, which were not designed for deep-sea navigation. Small, and having low freeboard (frequently around ) these ships were designed never to be out of sight of land, and to be able to make quickly to a harbour when the weather turned foul.  has become the exemplar of the Irish Mercantile Marine in the Emergency. In Time of War, page 275: "Kerlogues tricolour, shredded by RAF gunfire is now in the National Maritime Museum of Ireland".</ref> and rescued both sides. Her rescue of 168 German sailors, given her size, was dramatic. From January 1941, British authorities required Irish ships to visit a British port and obtain a "navicert". This visit sometimes proved fatal. A ship with a "navicert" was given free passage through allied patrols and fuel, however they would be searched. Irish ships on the "Lisbon run" carried UK exports to Spain and Portugal.

Atlantic routes

 

Some British ships traded between Ireland and Britain. Other destinations were served by Irish and other neutral ships. Philip Noel-Baker (Churchill's Parliamentary Secretary) was able to tell the British parliament that "no United Kingdom or Allied ship has been lost while carrying a full cargo of goods either to or from Eire on an ocean voyage." He added "a very high proportion of imports from overseas sources into Eire, and of such exports as are sent overseas from Eire, are already carried in ships on the Eire or on a neutral register." and "The trade between Great Britain and Eire is of mutual benefit to both countries, and the risks to British seamen which it involves are small."

In the economic depression, the Limerick Steamship Company sold both its ocean-going ships, Knockfierna and Kilcredane. They were Ireland's last ocean-going ships. At the outbreak of hostilities Ireland did not have a ship designed to cross the Atlantic. British ships were not available. American ships would only travel to Portugal. Ireland depended on other neutrals. In 1940 a succession of these ships, from Norway, Greece, Argentina, and Finland, usually carrying wheat to Ireland, were lost. Soon many of these nations were no longer neutral. Ireland had to acquire its own fleet. Irish Shipping was formed. Irish Poplar was Irish Shipping's first ship. It was acquired in Spain after it had been abandoned by its crew. Other ships were acquired from Palestine, Panama, Yugoslavia, and Chile. Frank Aiken, the Minister for the Co-ordination of Defensive Measures in the Irish government, negotiated the bareboat chartering of two oil-burning steamships from the United States Maritime Commission's reserve fleet. Three ships were from Estonia, They were in Irish ports when Estonia was annexed by the Soviet Union. Their crews refused to return to the new Estonian SSR. The ships were sold to Irish Shipping. The SS Cetvrti (Jugoslavia) was abandoned in Dingle Bay after being strafed on 1 December 1940. She was salvaged by Fort Rannoch of the Irish Navy; she was purchased and renamed Irish Beech.
An Italian ship, Caterina Gerolimich had been trapped in Dublin since the outbreak of the war. After the fall of Italian Fascism she was chartered, repaired and renamed Irish Cedar. When the war was over, she returned to Naples with a cargo of food, a gift from Ireland to war-ravaged Italy.  was bought on 17 June 1941. She was 46 years old, and required extensive repairs. "She was fit for nothing but the scrap yard." A British yard bid for, and won, the contract to renovate her. This work was completed in November 1943. Even though the Irish government paid for her purchase and for the repairs she was requisitioned by the British Ministry of War Transport and renamed Empire Don. She was returned to Irish Shipping in 1945.

The Irish Shipping fleet imported, across the Atlantic: 712,000 tons of wheat, 178,000 tons of coal, 63,000 tons of phosphate (for fertilizer), 24,000 tons of tobacco, 19,000 tons of newsprint, 10,000 tons of timber and 105,000 tons of assorted other cargo. Figures from the other shipping companies have not survived.

After the war

When the hostilities were over, on 16 May 1945, Éamon de Valera, in his speech to the nation said: "To the men of our Mercantile Marine who faced all the perils of the ocean to bring us essential supplies, the nation is profoundly grateful." The Ringsend area of Dublin has a long maritime tradition. When housing was being redeveloped in the 1970s, some streets were named after ships which were lost: Breman Road, Breman Grove, Cymric Road, Isolda Road, Pine Road, Leukos Road, Kyleclare Road and Clonlara Road. The "An Bonn Seirbhíse Éigeandála" for "An tSeirbhís Mhuir-Thráchtála" or in English: "Emergency Service Medal" of the "Mercantile Marine Service"'', was awarded to all who had served six months, or longer, on an Irish-registered ship in the Emergency.

On 24 September 2001, a plinth and plaque, embossed with the Irish tricolour was erected to commemorate those crews lost on neutral Irish registered vessels in 1939-45. "a very significant gesture by our British friends towards recognising the debt of honour owed to all shipmates irrespective of nationality who lost their lives in the Second World War." in the National Memorial Arboretum in England.

In Dublin, an annual commemoration, is held on the third Sunday of November. The Cork commemoration is held on the fourth Sunday of November in the former offices of the White Star Line. The Belfast commemoration is held on the second Sunday of May.

Ships

See also

 The Emergency (Ireland) - internal, national issues in World War II
 Irish neutrality during World War II - international relations
  - the exemplar of neutral Irish ships in World War II.
 Battle of the Atlantic

Footnotes

References

Publications

 
 
 
 
 
 
 
 
 
 
 
 
 
 
 
 
 
 (Later republished as:)

External links
 Commemorative Brochure (Maritime Institute of Ireland)
 Irish Seamens' Relatives Association
 Commemoration, includes two videos
 Irish Mercantile Marine Deaths 1940 - 1945

Independent Ireland in World War II
Ireland and the Commonwealth of Nations
Maritime history of Ireland
Merchant navy